Saint-Maurice-la-Clouère is a commune in the Vienne department in the Nouvelle-Aquitaine region in western France.

Geography
The village lies on the right bank of the Clouère, which forms the commune's southwestern border.

See also
Communes of the Vienne department

References

Communes of Vienne